Christopher Pepin-Neff is an American-Australian social scientist, public policy lecturer, and LGBTQ rights activist. He is known for his research and findings on public behavior and shark attacks. 

Pepin-Neff is a former president of the Gay and Lesbian Activists Alliance.

Education

Pepin-Neff holds a BA in Political Science from James Madison University in Virginia (1999) and a Master’s degree in Public Policy from the University of Sydney (2007). He also earned a PhD in Public Policy from the University of Sydney (2014).

Research

Pepin-Neff is a lecturer in public policy at the University of Sydney and his area of research includes agenda setting, policy advocacy and the political dimensions of shark attacks. His 2013 study published in the Journal of Environmental Studies and Sciences argued that not all shark encounters are attacks and sharks should not be hunted with nets because of their reputation as killers. The study also reflected that television programs and movies imprints certain images in the public’s mind of sharks, which needs to be corrected. He examined the shark hunt policies implemented by different WA Governments between 2000 and 2014 and found similarities with the 1975 Hollywood film Jaws.

In the same year, Pepin-Neff and Thomas Wynter surveyed Shark Valley at Sea Life Sydney Aquarium to examine the public perception of sharks, causes of shark bites, and public sentiment towards the culling of sharks. The study, published in Marine Policy, concluded that people were less frightened of sharks than previously assumed and that 87 percent of 583 respondents said that sharks should not be killed upon understanding shark behavior.

Activism

Pepin-Neff has been an activist for LGBTQ causes. Certain reforms and changes to the discourse of policies governing the lives of people in the LGBTQ community have taken place due to his activism. He was a lobbyist for the repeal of “Don't Ask, Don't Tell,” the ban on gays in the military. He also founded Q Street, the LGBTQ lobbyist and government affairs organization in the United States.

Selected bibliography

Pepin-Neff has contributed to many research books and journals.

Books

Book chapters

Journals

References

External link 

American expatriates in Australia
James Madison University alumni
American social scientists
Australian social scientists
University of Sydney alumni
American LGBT rights activists
Academic staff of the University of Sydney
Living people
Year of birth missing (living people)